Acalypha indica (English: Indian Acalypha, Indian Mercury, Indian Copperleaf, Indian Nettle, Three-seeded Mercury) is an herbaceous annual that has catkin-like inflorescences with cup-shaped involucres surrounding the minute flowers. It is mainly known for its root being attractive to domestic cats, and for its various medicinal uses. It occurs throughout the Tropics.

Description 

An erect annual herb that can be easily distinguished by the cup-shaped involucre that surrounds the small flowers in the catkin-like inflorescence.

The leaves are broad ovate, . The leaf base is rounded to shortly attenuate. The leaf margin is basally 5-nerved and is crenate-serrate with an acute or obtuse apex.

The tiny male flowers are white-green, located on the upper part of the flower spikes, and are ebracteate, minute, and clustered with vermiculiform anthers. The pollens are roughly round and approximately 10–12 microns in diameter.

The ovary is hispid, 3-lobed. Styles are 3, each 2-fid. Capsules are hispid, 3-valved and concealed by a bract. The stem is striate (longitudinally ribbed) and pubescent.

Habitat
It grows in disturbed places such as waste lands, road sides, crevices in walls. It also grows in rocky hillsides, forest edges and river banks. It prefers moist and shaded places. It grows from sea-level up to 1350 m altitude.

Geographic distribution
Acalypha indica occurs widely throughout the Old World tropics. In Africa, it occurs in Nigeria in West Africa and further widely throughout tropical Africa and the Indian Ocean islands. It also occurs in India, South East Asia, Yemen, and Oceania. It has been introduced to the New World Tropics.

Effect on domestic cats

Throughout the area where the plant grows, it is widely known for its effect on domestic cats, which react very strongly and favorably to the root of the plant. In this regard it is very similar to catnip, but the effect is much more pronounced.

Traditional uses

The plant has many traditional medicinal uses.  In Madagascar, the crushed plant is used for skin parasites. In Mauritius, the sap of crushed leaves mixed with salt, or a decoction of plant, is used for scabies and other skin problems. In the Seychelles and Réunion, a root infusion or decoction is taken for asthma, and also to clean the liver and kidneys. The root decoction is also taken for intestinal worms and stomach ache. The leaf sap is taken as an emetic. An infusion together with the roots of Tylophora indica is taken in Réunion as an emetic in the case of poisoning. A leaf infusion is also taken as a purgative and vermifuge in Réunion and Madagascar. In East Africa sap of the leaves is used for eye infections. Leaf powder is used for maggot-infested wounds.  Acalypha indica is listed in the Pharmacopoeia of India as an expectorant to treat asthma and pneumonia. It was formerly listed in the British Pharmacopoeia.

This plant is held in high esteem in traditional Tamil Siddha medicine as it is believed to rejuvenate the body.  The plant has also been eaten as a vegetable in Africa and India, but care needs when eating it since it contains several alkaloids as well as hydrocyanic acid.

Analysis of the shoots yielded per 100 g edible portion: water 80 g, energy 269 kJ (64 kcal), protein 6.7 g, fat 1.4 g, carbohydrate 6 g, fiber 2.3 g, Ca 667 mg, P 99 mg, Fe 17 mg and ascorbic acid 147 mg.

Chemical constituents
The arial parts contain a cyanogenic glycoside called acalyphin (a 3-cyanopyridone derivative) as well as flavonoids, such as kaempferol glycosides mauritianin, clitorin, nicotiflorin, and biorobin. Tannins, β-sitosterol, acalyphamide, aurantiamide, succinimide, and flindersin (a pyranoquinolinone alkaloid) have also been isolated.

The chemicals that attract cats are the iridoid compounds isodihydronepetalactone and isoiridomyrmecin.

Medicinal effects and uses

Some of the chemical compounds in Acalypha indica cause dark chocolate-brown discoloration of blood, and gastrointestinal irritation in rabbits. Ingestion of Acalypha indica may lead to hemolysis in people suffering from glucose-6-phosphate dehydrogenase deficiency. Acalyphin is used as a substitute for ipecacuanha, a vermifuge, expectorant and emetic. Acalypha indica leaves are used in the traditional medicine of India as a jaundice remedy.

References

External links
 
 

indica
Leaf vegetables
Medicinal plants of Asia
Medicinal plants of Africa
Flora of Africa
Flora of tropical Asia
Plants described in 1753
Taxa named by Carl Linnaeus
Siddha medicine
Cat attractants